The tornado outbreak of April 8–9, 2015 was a relatively small but damaging outbreak of tornadoes that occurred in parts of the Great Plains and in the Midwestern United States. 27 tornadoes were confirmed during the two days, most of them weak, however a select few of them were powerful and damaging.

By far the most significant tornado of the outbreak was a very high-end EF4 wedge tornado that struck the towns of Rochelle and Fairdale, Illinois, causing catastrophic damage. It was also the strongest tornado recorded in 2015, as well as the strongest to occur in Illinois since the F5 tornado that struck Plainfield in 1990.

Meteorological synopsis
On April 4, the Storm Prediction Center (SPC) issued their Day 6 severe weather outlook, highlighting a substantial and widespread risk for severe weather from southeastern Oklahoma to northeastern Illinois valid for April 9. This threat area was maintained in the Day 5 outlook and narrowed to a corridor from southern Missouri into northern Illinois in the Day 4 outlook. On April 7, a Day 3 Enhanced risk was issued across most of Illinois, eastern Missouri, and small portions of adjacent states. No further changes to the threat level were made, although the Enhanced risk was significantly expanded late on April 8 to include portions of the southern Great Lakes, lower Ohio Valley, Ozark Plateau, and Arklatex region. Around midday on April 9, the SPC issued a 10% hatched tornado threat area across much of northern Illinois and small portions of nearby states, signifying the potential for several tornadoes, of which one or two had the potential to be strong (EF2 or stronger on the Enhanced Fujita scale).

The catalyst for the severe weather outbreak came as a positively-tilted shortwave trough progressed across the central High Plains into the Great Plains and eventually through the western Great Lakes region. A weaker disturbance pushed from the Ozarks into the Northeast United States, acting to strengthen southwesterly winds aloft across the risk area. At the surface, a weak area of low pressure initially centered over northeastern Kansas early on April 9 progressed steadily northeast while intensifying, reaching the trisection of Iowa, Wisconsin, and Illinois by late that evening. A cold front stemming from the low progressed eastward across the Mid-South, whereas an arching warm front slowly pushed northward across eastern Iowa and northern Illinois. Modest surface heating ahead of the cold front allowed mid-level CAPE values to reach 1,000–1,500 J/kg, and a mass of rich moisture transported northward from the Gulf of Mexico pushed dewpoints into the lower 60s °F across the Enhanced risk area. Winds at 850mb strengthened at or above 45 mph (75 km/h) atop winds of 70 mph (110 km/h) at 700mb, creating a favorable setup for sustained supercells. Although the overall directional component of low-level winds was expected to be less than ideal as a whole, a small area of southeasterly surface winds developed near the surface low in northern Illinois.

At 1:50 p.m. CDT (18:50 UTC), the SPC issued a tornado watch for northern and central Illinois, far northwestern Indiana, far southern Wisconsin, and portions of Lake Michigan. A 60% chance of two or more tornadoes was assessed across the watch box, with a 40% chance of at least one strong tornado. Isolated shower activity had already begun forming across the region just prior to the issuance of watch, eventually growing into a line of strong to severe thunderstorms, including supercells.

Confirmed tornadoes

April 8 event

April 9 event

Franklin Grove–Kirkland–Rochelle–Fairdale, Illinois

By far the most destructive and significant tornado of the outbreak was a violent, very high-end EF4 wedge tornado that tore through parts of Rochelle, Illinois and the adjacent town, Fairdale, Illinois.  The tornado began as a small cone-shaped tornado, causing mostly minor damage near Franklin Grove and Ashton, though a Crest Foods plant sustained considerable damage. The tornado became large and violent as it struck a semi-rural subdivision west of Rochelle, where some ground scouring occurred and large, anchor-bolted homes were swept away, though close inspection revealed that some of the washers were missing from the anchor bolts, and that low-lying shrubbery and vehicles near the homes was left mostly intact, preventing a higher rating. Winds in this area were estimated to have reached 200 mph, the very upper limit of the EF4 range. The tornado briefly weakened to EF2 strength as it passed between Hillcrest and Kings, damaging several farmsteads before reaching high-end EF4 intensity once again as it crossed IL 64, where a row of five homes was obliterated, along with a nearby farmstead. Extensive wind-rowing of debris occurred in nearby fields, and vehicles were tossed. A large restaurant was destroyed by EF3 level winds in this area as well. The tornado then weakened, causing EF1 to EF2 damage to a warehouse structure, outbuildings, and numerous trees as it passed south of Lindenwood. East of Lindenwood, further weakening occurred as the tornado damaged homes and outbuildings at EF1 strength, and a brief EF0 satellite tornado was observed. The tornado re-intensified to high-end EF3 strength as it devastated the small town of Fairdale, where the two fatalities occurred. Every structure in town sustained some type of damage, and multiple poorly anchored homes were leveled and swept away. Intense cycloidal marks were observed in farm fields outside of town. Past Fairdale, the tornado produced EF2 and EF3 damage as large barns were destroyed, a house lost its second floor and sustained collapse of exterior walls on the first floor, and large hardwood trees were denuded and sustained some debarking before the tornado dissipated northwest of Kirkland.

A 2-minute long video recording of the tornado in the Fairdale area exists which shows a near-death experience recorded by Clarence “Clem” Schultz (85), a man who was a resident of the area when the tornado began to form. The two fatalities of the disaster were Clem's wife, Geraldine “Geri” Schultz (67), and their neighbor, Jacklyn Klosa (69).

See also
Tornado outbreak of November 17, 2013
Tornado outbreak of April 8–9, 1999

Notes

References

2015 natural disasters in the United States
2015-04-09
F4 tornadoes by location
Tornadoes of 2015
2015 Tornado outbreak
2015 in Illinois
2015 in Kansas
2015 in Texas
April 2015 events in the United States